The 2017 season was the 103rd in Sociedade Esportiva Palmeiras existence. This season Palmeiras participated in the Campeonato Paulista, Copa Libertadores, Copa do Brasil and the Série A.

Players

Squad information 
Squad at the end of the season.

Copa Libertadores squad 
.

Transfers

Transfers in

Transfers out

Competitions

Overview

Friendlies

Campeonato Paulista

First stage 
The draw was held on November 1, 2016. Palmeiras was drawn on Group C.

Knockout stages

Quarter-final

Semifinal

Copa Libertadores

Group stage 

The draw of the tournament was held on 21 December 2016, 20:00 PYST (UTC−3), at the CONMEBOL Convention Centre in Luque, Paraguay. Palmeiras was drawn on the Group 5.

Knockout stage

Round of 16 
The draw for this round was held on June 14. As Palmeiras finished first in his group, they hosted the second leg.

Campeonato Brasileiro

Standings

Matches

Results by round

Copa do Brasil 

As a team that disputed the Copa Libertadores, Palmeiras entered in the round of 16. The draw was held on April 20, 2017.

Round of 16

Quarter-final 
The draw was held on June 5, 2017.

Statistics

Overall statistics

Goalscorers 
In italic players who left the team in mid-season.

References

External links 
 Official site 

2017
Palmeiras